Carolina Cristina Alves is a Joan Robinson Research Fellow in Heterodox Economics at Girton College at the University of Cambridge, a co-founder of Diversifying and Decolonising Economics D-Econ, and an editor of the Developing Economics blog (DE Blog). She sits on the Rebuilding Macroeconomics Advisory Board (RM Advisory Council), the Progressive Economy Forum Council (PEF) and Positive Money .

Career 
Alves graduated from São Paulo State University in 2003 with a bachelor's degree in economics, and then the Universidade Estadual de Campinas with a Masters in the Sociology in 2007. Alves earned her PhD in Economics from SOAS University of London in 2017. She is a member of the Cambridge Social Ontology Group (CSOG) and the Alternative Approaches to Economics Research Group at the University of Cambridge. She has been a Joan Robinson Research Fellow in Heterodox Economics at Girton College at the University of Cambridge since October 2017. She is also a College Teaching Officer in Economics at Cambridge.

Alves is a co-founder of Diversifying and Decolonising Economics, a "network of economists that aim to promote inclusiveness in economics" in academic content and in the field's institutional structures. Known as "D-Econ", the organization works to promote an approach to the study of economics that encompasses the diversity of identity, the diversity of approaches, and decolonization in order to combat institutional structures that have created the "homogenous composition of the profession". Current and upcoming projects involve the creation of a database of marginalized scholars, guidelines for inclusive practices for organizations and conferences, and a network of organizations and activists with like-minded visions. Alves is also a member of the organization's steering committee.

As a member of the Rebuilding Macroeconomics Advisory Group, Alves is a part of a research initiative aimed at re-invigorating macroeconomics and bringing it back to the fore as a policy-relevant social science. The organization supports "creative" research that may impact real-world economic issues.

Alves is also a co-editor of the Developing Economics blog, which takes a critical approach to creating discussion and reflection in the field of developing economics. She has contributed several articles of her own, including "Unanswered Questions on Financialisation in Developing Economies" and "The Financialization Response to Economic Disequilibria: European and Latin American Experiences".

Research and academic work 
Alves' research focuses on macroeconomics, international macro-finance, political economy and Marxian economics.

Before her PhD, Alves focused on issues relating to financial capital, the labour theory of value, and social classes. During her MPhil, she looked at the historical and theoretical development of the relationship between value and labour in economics. While doing her MPhil, she was also a research assistant for the State of São Paulo Research Foundation (FAPESP — BR) on a project concerning income transfer strategies for governments. Her PhD thesis, titled Stabilisation or financialisation: examining the dynamics of the Brazilian public debt, examined Brazilian public debt between 1994 and 2014 and the vicious cycle between financial liberalization, high interest rates, and the growth of domestic public debt.

After the completion of her PhD, Alves has further studied fiscal and monetary policy through an analysis of the International Monetary Fund (IMF) and World Bank's literature on public debt management and its impact on the development of government bond markets.

Since early 2019, Alves has been organizing a special issue of the Cambridge Journal of Economics that examines the financialization process in both developing and emerging economies, a concept stemming from conversations about the risks of financial liberalization and globalization.

Selected scholarships 
Synthesis Report: Empirical analysis for new ways of global engagement

Together with Vivienne Boufounou, Konstantinos Dellis, Christos Pitelis and Jan Toporowski, Alves produced a synthesis report looking at the increasing integration of developing and emerging economies into the global financial system through the increasing cross-border flows of capital. They argue that a close examination of net capital flows cannot explain this integration, while the increasing involvement of the private sector in the external debt of developing countries does reflect this increasing integration into the financial system.

Such integration increases these countries' exposure to various financial risks and subjects their economies to different factors that drive these capital flows. The authors point out that the increased participation of developing and emerging economies in the world's financial system represents potential for the development of new multilateral relationships, and these economies can also be a crucial source of finance for the European continent at a time of financial distress. This paper was published as a FESSUD working paper in August 2016.

References 

British economists
British women economists
Fellows of Girton College, Cambridge
Living people
São Paulo State University alumni
State University of Campinas alumni
Year of birth missing (living people)